Carus as a surname may refer to:
 Carl Gustav Carus (1789-1869), German physiologist and painter
 Emma Carus (1879-1927), American contralto singer
 Julius Victor Carus (1823-1903), German zoologist and entomologist
 Marcus Aurelius Carus (c. 224-283), Roman emperor
 Paul Carus (1852-1919), German-American author, editor and philosopher
 Titus Lucretius Carus (c. 99 BC- c. 55 BC), Roman poet and philosopher
 Saint Carus of Malcesine, (Caro di Malcesine) often referenced with Benignus of Malcesine

Carus may also refer to:
 Carus and The True Believers, Australian band
 Carus Mathematical Monographs, book series published by the Mathematical Association of America
 Carus Lectures, lecture series convened by the American Philosophical Association
 Carus, Oregon, an unincorporated community in the United States
 Carus Publishing Company, American publishing company
 Carus-Verlag, German choral music publisher and record label
 Hegeler Carus Mansion, historic building in La Salle, Illinois, United States